The Fulkerson–Chen–Anstee theorem is a result in graph theory, a branch of combinatorics. It provides one of two known approaches solving the digraph realization problem, i.e. it gives a necessary and sufficient condition for pairs of nonnegative integers  to be the indegree-outdegree pairs of a simple directed graph; a sequence obeying these conditions is called "digraphic". D. R. Fulkerson (1960) obtained a characterization analogous to the classical Erdős–Gallai theorem for graphs, but in contrast to this solution with exponentially many inequalities. In 1966 Chen  improved this result in demanding the additional constraint that the integer pairs must be sorted in non-increasing lexicographical order leading to n inequalities. Anstee  (1982) observed in a different context that it is sufficient to have . Berger  reinvented this result and gives a direct proof.

Statement

Stronger versions

Other notations
The theorem can also be stated in terms of zero-one matrices. Note that the diagonal of the matrix only contains zeros. There is a connection to the relation majorization. Sequence  can also be determined by a corrected Ferrers diagram. Since  by applying the principle of double counting, the theorem above states that a pair of nonnegative integer sequences  with nonincreasing  is digraphic if and only if vector  majorizes .

Generalization

Characterizations for similar problems
Similar theorems describe the degree sequences of simple graphs, simple directed graphs with loops, and simple bipartite graphs. The first problem is characterized by the Erdős–Gallai theorem. The latter two cases, which are equivalent see Berger, are characterized by the Gale–Ryser theorem.

See also
Kleitman–Wang algorithms

References

Theorems in graph theory